Saint-Lambert-du-Lattay is a former commune in the Maine-et-Loire department in western France. On 31 December 2015, it was merged into the new commune Val-du-Layon.

Geography

The commune is situated 28 km south-by-west of Angers on the way towards Cholet. Saint-Lambert-du-Lattay is on the south bank of the river Layon and the river Hyrôme flows through the eastern part of the village. The banks of the rivers host vineyards which are notably producing Coteaux du layon and other Anjou wines.

History
War in the Vendée (1793–1796) and especially the battle of Pont-Barré took place in Saint-Lambert-du-Lattay during the French Revolution.

Twin towns
 Linkebeek (Belgium) since 1981
 Kenton (England) since 1996

Miscellaneous
Patrick Dewaere (actor) is buried in the cemetery of Saint-Lambert-du-Lattay

See also
Communes of the Maine-et-Loire department

References

External links

  Official website of the commune

Saintlambertdulattay